Trevor Rodney Kidd (born March 29, 1972) is a Canadian former Ice hockey goaltender who last played for the Hannover Scorpions in the Deutsche Eishockey Liga. Throughout his 12-year National Hockey League career, Kidd played for the Calgary Flames, Carolina Hurricanes, Florida Panthers, and Toronto Maple Leafs. A first-round draft pick, Kidd was selected 11th overall by the Flames in the 1990 NHL Entry Draft.

Playing career
Kidd spent the majority of his junior career with the Brandon Wheat Kings of the Western Hockey League. In 1989–90, He was named a WHL East First Team All-Star, the Del Wilson Trophy as WHL goaltender of the year, and won the CHL Goaltender of the Year award.  He was traded to the Spokane Chiefs in 1991, and led them to the Memorial Cup championship. Kidd represented Canada three times at the World Junior Ice Hockey Championships, winning gold medals in 1990 and 1991. He also won a silver medal at the 1992 Winter Olympics as the national team's backup goaltender.

Kidd played his first NHL game in the 1991–92 NHL season with the Calgary Flames, a loss to the Pittsburgh Penguins on March 3, 1992. His second game, the only other game he would play that season, was a 4–3 victory over the San Jose Sharks on April 15, 1992.

Kidd stepped in full-time with the Flames in the 1993–94 NHL season, playing 31 games as backup to netminder Mike Vernon. He remained with the team through the 1996–97 NHL season. Kidd was traded prior to the start of the 1997–98 NHL season to the Carolina Hurricanes for center Andrew Cassels and goaltender Jean-Sébastien Giguère. Two years in Carolina followed where Kidd played with Sean Burke. The following year, goalie Arturs Irbe joined the team and the Hurricanes left Kidd unprotected for the upcoming expansion draft.

After being selected by the Atlanta Thrashers in the 1999 NHL Expansion Draft, Kidd was immediately traded to the Florida Panthers. Kidd started strong for the Panthers in the first 11 games of the 1999–2000 NHL season, but he was injured trying to make a save on a shot from teammate Peter Worrell during a league-mandated skills competition. This injury forced the Panthers to trade forward Radek Dvorak to the New York Rangers as part of a three-way deal with the San Jose Sharks for goaltender Mike Vernon, who left after the season for free agency. When Kidd returned from injury, he was not able to reestablish himself as the team's starting goaltender. The Panthers had acquired young goaltender Roberto Luongo and forward Olli Jokinen from the New York Islanders for forwards Mark Parrish and Oleg Kvasha, and Luongo edged out Kidd for the starter's role in the 2001–02 NHL season.  He continued to fill the backup role for one more season before being released after clearing waivers before the 2002–03 NHL season.

Kidd signed with the Toronto Maple Leafs as a free agent on August 26, 2002. He had been closely connected to the Maple Leafs prior to the signing. Kidd followed up a 6–10–2 season in the 2002–03 NHL season with a 6–5–2 record (3.26 GAA, .876 save percentage) in 15 games in the 2003–04 NHL season. His final game was a 7–2 loss to the Philadelphia Flyers in which he replaced Ed Belfour.

During the NHL lockout, Kidd played with team HC Örebro 90 in Sweden. In May 2005, he signed a deal with the Hannover Scorpions in the DEL.

Personal
Kidd and his wife Tiffany have three daughters, who are avid soccer players. Taylor (born 1993) played soccer for the UTEP Miners from 2012 to 2015, Kennedy (born 1997) played with the North Dakota Fighting Hawks women's team, and Emerson (born 2001) also played for UTEP and trained with the Canadian National Team for the 2015 FIFA Women's World Cup. 

Kidd is now an analyst for the Winnipeg Jets with TSN Winnipeg.

Career statistics

Regular season and playoffs

International

Awards
 WHL East First All-Star Team – 1990

References

External links

1972 births
Living people
Brandon Wheat Kings players
Calgary Flames draft picks
Calgary Flames players
Canadian ice hockey goaltenders
Carolina Hurricanes players
Florida Panthers players
Hannover Scorpions players
Ice hockey players at the 1992 Winter Olympics
Louisville Panthers players
Medalists at the 1992 Winter Olympics
National Hockey League first-round draft picks
Olympic ice hockey players of Canada
Olympic medalists in ice hockey
Olympic silver medalists for Canada
People from Dugald, Manitoba
Salt Lake Golden Eagles (IHL) players
Spokane Chiefs players
St. John's Maple Leafs players
Toronto Maple Leafs players
Winnipeg Jets announcers
Canadian expatriate ice hockey players in Germany
Canadian expatriate ice hockey players in the United States